Emmerich is a railway station in Emmerich am Rhein, North Rhine-Westphalia, Germany.

The Station

Emmerich station is the German railway station closest to the Dutch border on the Arnhem-Oberhausen railway. It is served hourly by trains operating the Rhein-IJssel-Express between Arnhem and Düsseldorf.

The station is largely used by freight and features both the Dutch and German voltages on most tracks. In the past all trains had to change from a Dutch to a German locomotive and vice versa at Emmerich, but now there are more Dual Voltage locomotives that can operate in many countries, so through running often happens now without stopping.

The ICE from Amsterdam to Cologne, Frankfurt/Main and Basel all pass through the station without stopping. 

With the introduction of ICE 3 trains in 2000 the service between the Netherlands and Emmerich stopped, From the timetable change in December 2005, Dutch train operator Syntus started a weekend service between Arnhem and Emmerich. However, the service was unsuccessful and terminated after 6 months.

In early 2014 platforms 1 and 2 were modernised, including new paving and the construction of a waiting shelter. 

In December 2016 Abellio Deutschland began operating the RB35 between Düsseldorf, Duisburg, Emmerich and Arnhem.

Train services
The station is served by the following service(s):

Regional services  Arnhem - Emmerich - Wesel - Oberhausen - Duisburg - Düsseldorf

Bus Services
A number of bus services are operated by NIAG and LOOK to the surrounding area. These are:

 SB58 (Emmerich - Kleve - Kranenburg - Nijmegen (NL) )
 88 (Emmerich - Vrasselt - Praest - Rees)
 91 (Emmerich - 's-Heerenberg (NL) )
 92 (Emmerich - Speelberg)
 93 (Emmerich - Vrasselt - Praest)
 94 (Emmerich - Borghees - Elten)

Gallery

References

External links
DB Website 
Verkehrsgemeinschaft Niederrhein 
NIAG Website 

Railway stations in North Rhine-Westphalia